The Royal Guard Company is the part of Royal Life Guards which serves as an active protection force for the Danish royal family. Of the 300 in the company, 280 are conscripts.

Organisation
There are 4 Guard teams, made of approximately 80 conscripts and 8 sergeants. The teams are arranged by height, with the tallest conscripts serving in 1st team and the shortest in 4th team.

Guard duties
The Royal Life Guards provide a permanent guard at the Amalienborg Palace, Kastellet (part of the old fortification of Copenhagen), Rosenborg Castle/garrison of the Royal Life Guards in Copenhagen and the garrison of Høvelte. On occasions guard is kept at Fredensborg Palace, Marselisborg Palace, Gråsten Palace, Christiansborg Palace and other locations inside the Danish realm.

Drum Corps
One part of the Guard Company is the Fife and drum corps, which consists of 8 drums and 8 fifes. It originally consisted of conscripts, however, after the Defence agreement 2005–09 which changed the conscription time for Life Guards from 12 to 8 months, there was not enough time to train the conscripts. The corps is therefore mostly enlisted.

Traditions

Uniform
The review order uniform of the Royal Life Guards, worn while they are on guard duty, consists of bearskin headdresses, dark blue tunics and light blue trousers with white stripes. The ceremonial uniform, worn on special state occasions, substitutes a scarlet tunic for the dark blue. The bearskin dates from 1803 and is decorated with the regiment's bronze cap badge (the Sun and Royal Coat of Arms). Symbolic infantry sabers are carried by the rank and file. These were part of the spoils from the First Schleswig War of 1848–1851 and were originally derived from a French infantry weapon.

Queen's Watch
The regiment holds a traditional military parade every November at their barracks known as the "Queen's Parade". Following the parade, the sovereign hands over the “Queen’s Watch” to one guard for his/her exceptional service in the regiment. It has been a tradition since 1970, when Frederik IX first handed over a watch at a parade. Two years later, the "King’s Watch” was redubbed as the "Queen’s Watch” following the assumption of the current Danish monarch to the throne. The guard is appointed by their superiors and fellow soldiers.

Image gallery

See also
 Royal Life Guards (Denmark)
 Guard Hussar Regiment (Denmark)
 Guard Hussar Regiment Mounted Squadron

References

External links
 Official website

Royal guards
Military units and formations established in 1659
Guards of honour
Danish monarchy